The American Samoa women's national football team represents American Samoa in international women's association football. The team is controlled by the Football Federation American Samoa (FFAS) and managed by Beulah Oney, a former player. The Veterans Memorial Stadium is their home ground and their only goalscorer is Jasmine Makiasi, with only one goal.

American Samoa never qualified for a FIFA Women's World Cup, but entered the OFC Women's Nations Cup once, in the 1998 edition. The country also participated twice in the Pacific Games women's football tournament.

Overview
American Samoa's first international occurred in October 1998, when they faced Australia, for the 1998 OFC Women's Championship. The team was defeated 21–0 (with 7–0 in the half-time). Papua New Guinea, its second rival, also thrashed them, with a 9–0.

The team remained inactive until 2007, when they entered the Pacific Games football tournament, held in Samoa during August–September 2007. American Samoa finished last on the Group A, and scored its first (and only) goal, against the Cook Islands.

They didn't saw any improvement for the 2011 Pacific Games, where the team lost by thrashing defeats, like 8–0 with the Papuan team and 7–0 with the hosts. This was American Samoa's last participation in an international competition to the date.

As of September 1, 2017, American Samoa is on the 119th position (unranked) of the FIFA Women's World Ranking.

Results and fixtures

Legend

1998

2007

2011

2018

2019

Head-to-head record

Coaching staff

Managerial history

 Tunoa Lui (20??–2011)
 Uinifareti Aliva (2011)
 Beulah Oney (20??–20??)
 Larry Mana'o (2018–)

Players

Current squad
The following players were called up for the 2019 Pacific Games from 7–20 July in Apia, Samoa.

Caps and goals updated as of 15 July 2019, after the game against Tonga.

Recent call-ups
The following players have been called up for the team in the last 12 months.

Records

Most appearances
Currently, 19 players hold the record of the most caps:
Alma Manao
Angela Sao
Fetu Lakisa
Filiga Ioapo
Filiga Kerisiano
Fiso Letoi
Fuataina Siatu'u
Jasmine Makiasi
Lela Waetin
Lelamay Kerisiano
Meleane Ioapo
Meleane Kerisiano
Moaga Siaulaiga
Momi Ene
Nikki Tolmie
Sandra Herrera
Tofaagaolii Oloaluga
Trixie Mavaega
Tuiemanu Ripley

Competitive record

FIFA Women's World Cup

Olympic Games

OFC Women's Nations Cup

Pacific Games

See also

Sport in American Samoa
Football in American Samoa
Women's football in American Samoa
American Samoa men's national football team
American Samoa men's national under-23 football team
American Samoa men's national under-20 football team
American Samoa men's national under-17 football team
American Samoa women's national under-17 football team

References

Oceanian women's national association football teams
Football in American Samoa
women's
Women in American Samoa